is a Japanese adult role-playing video game originally released for NEC PC-98 computer systems, and remade for Microsoft Windows. The game's story is linear, with only one story decision near the end, leading to one of five different endings.

A five-part animated erotic direct-to-video series was adapted from the game's story. It also has a side story series,  (known as Words Worth Outer Stories in the English release). The anime has the same general story, but the anime cuts out several characters and changes the plot mostly to create more sex scenes. The English dub is notable for featuring real life porn actresses Jenna Jameson and Nikki Dial. The rest of the English cast remained uncredited.

Gameplay

The Gameplay of Words Worth is similar to other fantasy games of the era such as The Elder Scrolls II: Daggerfall but with a tongue and cheek sexual undertone. it is a remake of the 1993 game of the same name and while the plot in near identical, the graphics, gameplay, and visuals have been greatly improved.

Words Worth is primarily a first-person dungeon crawler. Even though there are a few "friendly" areas, such as the hero Astro's bedroom and a town where the hero can rest and buy supplies, most of the game is spent in dungeon-like, maze-like areas (with an auto-map feature). There is no party in the game: Astro has to face the enemies alone. The enemies appear randomly. The 1999 remake has you click on the enemies to slash them where as the combat in the 1993 original is turn-based. The game has scenes with nudity and sexual situations.

Like most fantasy role playing games Words Worth has lots of focus on story and narrative plot points but unlike many contemporaries in the fantasy genre Words Worth is entirely voice acted. As you play as a young hero trying to prove himself worthy while surrounded by vixens. The game falls very well into the style of many Japanese anime plots a young awkward protagonist surrounded by sexpot girls.

Plot
The skill of sword-fighting is known to two tribes, the Tribes of Light (which consists of humans living on the world's surface) and Shadow (largely part-human-part-animal creatures and monsters living in an underground city, who enjoy a lifespan five times as long as the Tribe of Light and age one-fifth as quickly). The two tribes lived in peace and harmony, their domains separated by the "Words Worth" tablet—a huge monolith slab erected by an almighty creator. Although the tablet has writing on it, neither Tribe can read the text. One day, Words Worth was mysteriously destroyed by an unknown entity; its fragments were scattered among the domain of the Tribes of Shadow. The two Tribes blamed each other for the tablet's destruction, and started a war that has continued for 150 years (100 in the anime). Astral, prince of the Tribe of Shadow, desires to become a Swordsman of Shadow. However, his father, King Wortoshika, forbids him to do so. He is engaged to Sharon, a beautiful swordswoman and Astral's childhood friend, who has feelings for Astral but wishes he were stronger.

Characters

Tribe of Shadow
Astral Prince of the Shadow realm, and heir to King Wortoshika. His name is based on Castor and is changed to 'Esterla' in the Media Blasters translation. A generic good-natured-but-oblivious video game protagonist who gains more experience over the course of the game. In the second half of the story, he is given the alias Pollux. In the anime, his character is more developed, being a natural swordsman who is also undisciplined and self-conscious (especially where his fiancée Sharon is concerned), and low on sexual morals. In both versions, he is eventually revealed to be the lost son of the legendary Light swordsman Pollux, after whom he was nicknamed because of his likeness with him. Voice actor: Kenichi Suzumura (credited as Ken Sozomura)

Sharon One of the two most formidable officers (along with Kaiser) of the Shadow Realm army and a lifelong friend of Astral's. Very beautiful, but stern and commanding. Engaged to Astral, but is only attracted to men who are stronger than her in combat; she gradually falls in love with him as he proves his competence. The DOS version of the game included a sex scene with Sharon, but this was cut out in the Win95 edition. One of the game endings has Astral together with Sharon. In the Media Blasters translation, she is named Shalom. Voice actor: Rie Nakamizu

Nina A catgirl who issues swordsman's licenses in the Shadow realm, and mother of Ariadne in the second half of the game. She has a secret crush on Astral. For many fans, she is the most-liked character in the series, likely due to her actions during the second half of the game. The DOS version of Nina was a clear parody of Lum, but her character was completely redesigned for the Win95 version. One of the game endings has Astral together with Nina. Voice actor: Emi Motoi (credited as Emi Nakano)

Kaiser His name is the German word for 'emperor'. One of the two most formidable Shadow swordsmen, his pride and desire to win Sharon's heart often place him at odds with Astral. In the game, he attempts to seduce Sharon while she is under the influence of an aphrodisiac-poisoned wound caused by Fabris; in the anime, she more openly rejects his advances. In the game, he begins living with Sharon during the Miyu, Nina, and Delta's endings. Kaiser is renamed 'Caesar' in both official translations of the anime. Voice actor: Jōichi Sawada

Wortoshika A large, muscular blue-skinned man, he is King of the Shadow tribe. His name could be a corruption of the term 'Wordseeker' due to the Japanese pronunciation.  Fiercely overprotective of his son. While ruthless and practical, he also has an honorable side. Voice actor: Takashi Tokorozawa

Tessio Chief advisor to Wortoshika. Along with his Light counterpart, Menza, he is part of an evil entity which actually has caused the war between the two tribes. (In the anime, they are aware of this, whereas in the game they are unwitting aspects of the dark entity.) His name is based on Salvatore Tessio, and his look is based on Peter Clemenza; the opposite is true for Menza. Voice actor: Soichi Nagashima

Stallion A lecherous half-horse, half-human officer of the Shadow tribe army.  He believes that "women from the Tribe of Light are more attractive", and often takes female prisoners to a torture chamber to rape them. He is most famous in an internet meme for the quote, "Your resistance only makes my penis harder!" In the series' subsequent omake, he is seen marrying Eoria; this detail is briefly mentioned in all five of the game's endings. In the game, he has grown an incongruous white mustache in the second half. Voice actor: Shinya Furumoto

Hyde A young Elf of the Shadow Tribe and Astral's best friend. Despite being a licensed swordsman, he is very timid and cowardly, and thus is ashamed of himself. In the game, he dies after succumbing to one of Club's machines; in the anime, he is slain by Sir Fabris after trying to stop him from raping Sharon. In both cases, his death affects Astral greatly.

Katra A living, willful Skeleton Warrior and officer in the Shadow tribe army, he serves as a soldier and at times a messenger. Voice actor: Utako

Delta A woman with gray, painted skin and bat wings, possibly a succubus.  In the game, she only appears in the second half, and seems to often get stuck in erotic situations. In the anime, her curiosity gets the better of her when she follows Tessio and Menza, and is subsequently raped and hypnotized to serve the two in a plot against Astral. One of the game endings has Astral together with Delta (this was added in the Win95 edition); she marries Rigel if the player chooses Sharon's, Nina's, or Miyu's endings. Voice actor: Tsutomu Takashima(OVA)/Ben Takada (game)

Ariadne Nina's and Astral's daughter. Only appears in the second half of the game. Uniting the blood from both the Light and Shadow Tribes, she ultimately plays the most vital role in reuniting the two tribes. Voice actor: Yoshino Kawayama

Carrot A small fairy which can control monsters much larger than her. Appears in the second half of the game only, in which she is captured and molested by William, and marries Rigel during Delta's ending. She has a small cameo appearance in the anime's omake episode at Stallion's and Eoria's wedding.

Weiss A friendly old person who dispenses advice to Astral. Weiss is male in the DOS version, female in the Win95 version, and does not appear in the anime.

Tribe of Light
Pollux At the end of the first half of the game, Maria blasts Astral 20 years forward into the future, where he grows a beard and loses all memory of who he was. Eventually, he adopts the identity Pollux (named after a legendary swordsman whom he resembles) and fights for the Tribe of Light. In the game, he doesn't regain his memories until very near the end of the story, whereas in the anime he regains them much earlier. Voice actor: Aihime Yoshida

Pollux (Sr.) A famous swordsman of the Tribe of Light, said to have died of illness but was in fact murdered, leading to his wife committing suicide. He had two children, a boy and a girl, who vanished after the attack. In the anime, it is revealed that Astral is his lost son, while the game also implies that Maria was the baby girl. The anime hints that he was killed by Wortoshika, while in the game, the combined form of Tessio and Menza was the culprit.

Miyu A novice sorceress, daughter of Maria, and initially William's fiancé. Is named Mew in the NuTech translation and Mu in the game's fan-translation, and only appears in the second half of the game. Has her life saved by Pollux and slowly develops feelings for him. One of the game endings has Astral together with Miyu; in the Nina, Sharon and Delta endings she marries William. There are some indications that she actually might be Astral's niece (Maria and Astral are hinted to be siblings in the game) or daughter (from his raping her mother in the anime), and as a result a sexual relationship between them would be incestuous. Voice actor: Naoko Takano (credited as Mirei Yamano)

Maria A sorceress, daughter of King Fabris, and mother of Miyu in the second half of the game, where she prefers to teleport enemies away rather than fight them. In the anime, she is raped by Astral after he falls into her prison cell. In the game, she is only an adopted child of Fabris, her biological parents being hinted to be the original Pollux and Maria, making her Astral's sister. Voice actor: Mimi Yamano

Maria (Sr.) Wife of the original Pollux, who threw herself into a lake along with her baby girl after her husband's death and her son's disappearance. Biological mother of Astral and, in the game, Maria. Her magic ring was passed down to Maria and later on to Miyu.

Fabris An older and more experienced knight, stronger than both Kaiser and Sharon. He is revealed at the end of the first half to be the (adoptive) father of Maria and king of the Tribe of Light, shortly after Astral severs his right arm. In both versions of events, he lusts over Sharon after seeing her fight, actively attempting to rape her in the anime and coating one of his daggers with an aphrodisiac—which successfully injures Sharon—in the game. Named Fabrees in the Media Blasters translation. Voice actor: Ikuya Fujiki

Menza Chief advisor to Fabris. Along with his Shadow counterpart, Tessio, he is part of an evil entity which actually has caused the war between the two tribes. (In the anime, they are aware of this, whereas in the game, they are unwitting aspects of the dark entity.)  His name is based on Peter Clemenza, and his look is based on Salvatore Tessio—the opposite is true for Tessio.

Epo A blue-haired swordswoman; named April in the fan-translation and Media Blasters translation. In the game, she is forced to strip by Astral and starts bawling (which scares Astral away); 20 years later, in the second half of the game, she becomes a shopkeeper in town. The DOS version of Epo is a parody of Nadia from Nadia: The Secret of Blue Water, but her character was completely redesigned for the Win95 version.  Epo has a small cameo appearance in the anime series as a stall owner, but is one of the main characters in the Gaiden anime, where it documents her adventures which lead her to conclude that the life of a swordswoman was not for her. She gets lost in the realm of the Shadow tribe and runs into monsters who sexually assaulted her at every turn. Her final monster encounter was Stallion, who begins molesting her, but is interrupted when Astral falls from a cliff and knocks Stallion into the water. Epo, still aroused by the sensations of Stallion's treatment of her, invites Astral to take her virginity.

Sabrina A dark-skinned, taciturn female knight. Is tortured, interrogated, and molested when she is captured by the Tribe of Shadows. She is strong-willed and would do nearly anything to destroy the enemy Tribe of Shadows. In the second half of the game, she becomes the mother of Rita. She also appears in the Gaiden anime, where she is Persia's dominant lesbian lover.

Rita A dark-skinned Light tribe swordswoman, and daughter of Sabrina who appears in the game's second half only. In the game, she is timid and reluctant to fight. At some point, she gets her posterior trapped in a hole in the ground; Pollux notices it in the ceiling and attempts to attack it. Later on, he jokingly calls her "butt-girl". In the anime, she is much more outgoing, and has a chance encounter with Wortoshika. Rita attempts to defeat him in the name of the Tribe of Light, but finds that he is too powerful and states that a death by him would be an honorable one. Instead, Wortoshika attempts to procreate in order to produce an heir following Astral's disappearance. It is implied that during this encounter, Rita and Wortoshika develop strong feelings for one another; Wortoshika offers her a home in the Shadow Tribe if the Tribe of Light refuses to take her back, and Rita sheds tears of anguish when Wortoshika later dies in the anime. Voice actor: Chiyo

Persia Servant and student of Sabrina who does not appear to enjoy sword-fighting. Is an adolescent in the game, but a juvenile adult in the Gaiden anime, where she has sexual encounters with both Astral and Sabrina.

Silvanna A tomboyish fencer, possibly a cousin of Maria. Named Silverna in the NuTech translation. In the game, she is captured and raped by Stallion.  In the second half, she is the mother of Eoria.  In the anime, she was captured along with Maria during the initial encounter with the Tribe of Shadow and is molested by two pig guards; Maria comes to her rescue before they can go through with their plans to gang-rape her.

Eoria Daughter of Silvanna, whom she strongly resembles in both appearance and personality. Appears only in the second half of the game. Stallion attempts to rape her in the second half by giving her an aphrodisiac, but Pollux stops Stallion and as a result, Eoria comes on to Pollux instead, snapping out of the drug-induced trance in mid-kiss. In an omake of the anime series, she is shown marrying Stallion—a detail mentioned in all five of the game's endings.

Bellabella A nymphomaniac sorceress who uses magic mushrooms for both magical and sexual purposes, and because of this appears to age very slowly (having exactly the same appearance in the second half of the story 20 years later). Is one of the two characters who is shown to have actual sexual intercourse with Astral in the game (the other being Nina). Named Belladonna in the game's fan translation. Does not appear in the anime.

Club A master trap-maker; named Kaleb in the fan-translation. In the game, he is one of the initial party to get captured by the Shadow Tribe (along with Fabris, Dark, Silvanna, Sabrina, and Maria), and later kills Hyde. In the anime, he has a very small unnamed appearance, piloting one of his war machines. Voice actor: Akio Suyama

Dark A fearless and brave swordswoman. In the second half, she is the mother of Vega. Does not appear in the anime. Renamed Arkia in the fan-translation.

Norman A somewhat pretentious swordsman. Has a power move that parodies the kamehameha from Dragon Ball. Boyfriend of Epo, but is later killed by Astral.  Makes a small appearance in the Gaiden anime as the injured boyfriend of Epo who attempts to find her when she falls in the river and gets lost.

Vega Daughter of Dark. Appears only in the second half of the game. Often contemplates finding a boyfriend and starting a family. In the DOS version, she is a swordswoman who has a sexual encounter with Pollux; in the Win95 version, she is an archer and has no such encounter. She has a small cameo appearance in the anime's omake episode at Stallion's and Eoria's wedding.

Algol A cowardly swordsman who is very greedy and attracted to gold. Has a habit of calling people by absurd names. Second half only. In all of the game's endings, he marries one of the four unnamed female shopkeepers (though which one is never specified). Not in the anime.

Rigel A dark-skinned lecherous swordsman. Second half of the game only. He believes that "women from the Tribe of Shadow are more attractive," making him somewhat of a counterpart to Stallion. (In fact, he and Stallion fight over Delta at one point.) Has a very brief cameo appearance in the anime. Marries Carrot in the Delta and harem endings, and Delta herself in all others.

William Son of Fabris, and fiancé of Miyu. Appears as a very young child standing up to Astral in the first half; 20 years later, he has "matured" into a cowardly swordsman who seizes credit for Pollux's achievements. Occasionally displays pedophilic tendencies (as evidenced by his treatment of Carrot).

Spin-Offs

Words Worth no Hitobito
 is a cross-over between Words Worth and The Mystery of Nonomura Hospital. In the first half of the game, Umihara, the main protagonist of The Mystery of Nonomura Hospital, enters the world of Words Worth as summoned by Wortoshika. The game takes place in the intervening 20 years between Astral's disappearance and reappearance.  In the second half, Sharon from Words Worth comes into the world of Nonomura Hospital and has a sexual affair with Umihara.

Release history
The original video game was made by ELF Corporation in 1993. The game was remade for Windows 95 in 1999, with some changed character designs, full-voice added to the supporting characters, 3D polygon graphics, and an opening animation sequence.  That same year, the anime adaptation was also released. The series was originally released in English by NuTech Digital in 1999. However, the license was lost due to NuTech being sued for failure to pay royalties. According to AnimeNation, that license was awarded in 2007 to Media Blasters, which will release the series under Kitty Media.

The Canada Border Services Agency ruled in 2007 that Words Worth is obscene under subsection 163(8) of the Criminal Code and is prohibited from being brought into the country.

In 2003, Words Worth was released in German by Trimax as Am Ende des Lichtes (At the End of the Light). Trimax also released Words Worth Gaiden in 2009 as Die Kriegerinnen des Lichts (The She-Warriors of Light).

Anime episode list (1999–2000)

Special episodes (2002–2009)
The series spawned two additional Gaiden OVA episodes and one comedic Omake episode. The Gaiden episodes take place in the final third of the episode "Pantheon of Play", the Omake following the conclusion of the original series.

References

External links
 Official website for the game 
 
 

1999 anime OVAs
Bandai Namco franchises
Bishōjo games
ELF Corporation games
Eroge
FM Towns games
Hentai anime and manga
NEC PC-9801 games
OVAs based on video games
Rape in fiction
X68000 games
Sword and sorcery anime and manga
Video games developed in Japan
Windows games
Internet memes